Naomi Ferres (born 26 October 1997) is an Australian rules footballer playing for the Western Bulldogs in the AFL Women's (AFLW). Ferres was drafted by the Western Bulldogs with the club's first selection and the third pick overall in the 2017 AFL Women's rookie draft from the VU Western Spurs . She was upgraded to the Bulldog's main playing list following an injury to Kimberley Ebb and subsequently made her debut in the twenty-six point win against  at VU Whitten Oval in the opening round of the 2018 season.

Ferres went on to win the 2018 AFL Women's Grand Final and took a crucial mark in the defensive 50 just before the siren to deny the Brisbane Lions a chance to tie the game. It was revealed that Ferres had signed a contract extension with the club on 16 June 2021, after playing 8 out of 9 games for the club that season.

Statistics
Statistics are correct to the end of the 2021 season.

|-
| scope=row | 2018 ||  || 16
| 8 || 0 || 0 || 35 || 24 || 59 || 11 || 18 || 0.0 || 0.0 || 4.4 || 3.0 || 7.4 || 1.4 || 2.3 || 0
|- style=background:#EAEAEA
| scope=row | 2019 ||  || 16
| 7 || 1 || 0 || 23 || 20 || 43 || 6 || 19 || 0.1 || 0.0 || 3.3 || 2.9 || 6.1 || 0.9 || 2.7 || 0
|-
| scope=row | 2020 ||  || 16
| 6 || 0 || 0 || 31 || 29 || 60 || 9 || 16 || 0.0 || 0.0 || 5.2 || 4.8 || 10.0 || 1.5 || 2.7 || 0
|- style=background:#EAEAEA
| scope=row | 2021 ||  || 16
| 8 || 0 || 0 || 44 || 44 || 88 || 14 || 17 || 0.0 || 0.0 || 5.5 || 5.5 || 11.0 || 1.8 || 2.1 || 0
|- class=sortbottom
! colspan=3 | Career
! 29 !! 1 !! 0 !! 133 !! 117 !! 250 !! 40 !! 70 !! 0.1 !! 0.0 !! 4.6 !! 4.0 !! 8.6 !! 1.4 !! 2.4 !! 0
|}

References

External links 

1997 births
Living people
Western Bulldogs (AFLW) players
Australian rules footballers from Victoria (Australia)